Nikamma is a 2022 Indian Hindi-language action comedy film directed by Sabbir Khan. It is a remake of the 2017 Telugu film Middle Class Abbayi and stars Abhimanyu Dassani, Shirley Setia and Shilpa Shetty. Nikamma was released theatrically on 17 June 2022 and received overwhelmingly negative reviews from critics and audience. The film was also a box-office bomb.

Plot
Adi is an unemployed youth with a eidetic memory, having issues with his  elder brother Raman as he dotes on Avni, Raman's wife (Adi's sister-in-law) and a RTO officer. For this, he left home fifteen months ago and since staying with his paternal uncle. Raman soon summons Adi and tells him to accompany Avni, who is transferred to Dhamli for two months as Raman is transferred to Bangalore. Avni compels Adi to do all the household chores, much to his annoyance. Adi tries to appoint a maid for house chores but Avni denies. She tries to pursue Adi to become a software engineer, but to no avail. One day, Adi bumps into Natasha aka Nikki, who instantly proposes to Adi. Adi is taken aback and falls for Nikki. Soon, it is revealed that Nikki is Avni's cousin and comes to live with her. Adi later finds out Nikki's real identity and also she had been seeing Adi since Avni and Raman's wedding. Avni learns about Adi and Nikki's love towards each other and sends Nikki home. Adi soon gets frustrated and wants to go back with his uncle when he comes to visit. But soon learns from him that, it was Raman's decision to send him away from home not Avni's as Raman wanted him to become more responsible. Avni made him do all the chores and chopping for cooking to make him realise the essence of hardwork. Moreover, She sent Nikki home as she is planning to send a marriage proposal to her family for Adi. For this, she wanted Adi to take a decent job and even decided to sell her land to buy a house for Adi. She still didn't take child as she considers Adi as her elder child and wishes to see him settle down first. 

On the other hand, Avni earns the enmity of MLA Vikramjeet Bisht, who runs a taxi service called Super. He floods the roads with his cabs to expand his business. When the bus service association raises an objection, he sets fire to one of the buses, killing 40 people. Avni takes action against Vikramjit and seizes his illegal cabs, which enrages Vikramjit and goes to RTO office to kill her. At the same moment, Adi (who has learnt Avni's sacrifices for his sake) thrashes him in public and warns him. Soon, Nikki's father denies Avni's marriage proposal of Adi and Nikki due to Adi's enmity to Vikramjeet. Avni takes Adi to Vikramjeet's house and makes him apologise to Vikramjeet for his action. But, Adi and Vikramjeet agree to bet on Avni's life without letting anyone know about this. Vikram challenges Adi that he will get Avni killed within six days. Vikramjeet plans various strategies to murder Avni, but Adi intelligently rescues her. Vikramjeet secretly invites Raman in Dhamli to stop Adi from sending Avni to Banglore. The next day after their second marriage anniversary celebration, Avni goes missing. Meanwhile, Vikramjeet secretly Kidnaps Raman and hides him in one of his four cabs which Avni seized. Adi rushes to Vikramjeet's house to ask Avni's whereabouts but to his surprise Vikramjeet himself is unaware of Avni's missing. Surprising everyone, Avni in police uniform comes along with a police force. Actually, Avni is an IPS officer who is assigned on a secret mission to collect proof against Vikramjeet for his misdeeds. They already collected the footage of Vikramjeet killing a retired major which can be used against him in court and the reason of his suspension from upcoming MLA election. Soon, the video is spread into the media. Unable to accept his defeat, Vikramjeet shoots himself revealing Raman's Kidnap but doesn't say where he is captivated as he thinks losing Raman will be Adi and Avni's biggest loss and his biggest victory. Soon, he is taken to the hospital but is shifted to coma. Adi finally figures out Raman's location and saves him with the help of Avni. Adi and Nikki get reunited. At the end credit, the whole family is enjoying and laughing at Adi as Avni again refuses to replace Adi to a maid to do house chores. A mid-credit scene shows Vikramjeet's eyes opening up as the screen cuts to black.

Cast 
 Abhimanyu Dassani as Aditya Singh (Adi)
 Shilpa Shetty as Avni Singh 
 Shirley Setia as Natasha "Nikki"
 Samir Soni as Raman Singh
 Abhimanyu Singh as MLA Vikramjeet Bisht (Vikram)
 Naren Kumar as Tipu
 Sachin Khedekar as Nagendra Singh
 Sudesh Lehri as Suresh Trivedi
 Vikram Gokhale as Retired Major
 Sammratt Kapoor as Darshi

Production

Development
Nikamma was announced in June 2019. It is a remake of 2017 Telugu film Middle Class Abbayi starring Nani.

Filming
Principal photography kicked off in July 2019, and Shetty joined the sets next month. The shooting was stopped in March 2020 owing to COVID-19 pandemic in India, before resuming in October 2020 and wrapping up in first week of November 2020.

Home Media 
The post-theatrical digital streaming rights were acquired by Netflix and was premiered on Netflix on 14 August 2022.

Music 

The music of the film is composed by Amaal Mallik, Javed–Mohsin, Vipin Patwa and Gourov Dasgupta with lyrics  written by Danish Sabri, Shabbir Khan, Kumaar and Sanjay Chhel.

The song "Nikamma" was recreated by Javed–Mohsin from the track "Nikamma Kiya Is Dil Ne" for the 2002 film Kyaa Dil Ne Kahaa which was sung by Shaan, Sanjivani Bhelande and written by Sanjay Chhel.

Release
Nikamma was released on 17 June 2022.

Reception 
Nikamma received mostly negative reviews from critics and audience. Shubhra Gupta of The Indian Express gave 0.5 out of 5 stars and wrote, "This Abhimanyu Dassani-Shilpa Shetty starrer is a film so moth-balled that it would have been roundly rejected even in the 80s." BH Harsh of Firstpost gave 1.5 out of 5 stars and wrote, "It wouldn't be an exaggeration to say that amongst all the genres Hindi Cinema has ever birthed or embraced, the 'Masala film' genre remains the most employed and yet the most misunderstood." Rachana Dubey of The Times of India gave 2 out of 5 stars and wrote, "Overall, the film could have done a lot if the writing was more clearly structured, the editing tighter and the direction a lot more focussed on finer details of the story and characters." Saibal Chatterjee of NDTV gave 1 out of 5 stars and wrote, "Abhimanyu Dassani struggles to rise above the script. Shirely Setia is a fetching presence but she has some way to go before she can be regarded as a finished article."

Box office
Nikamma was released in 1250 Screens. It earned only ₹51 Lakh' box office on its opening day.

References

External links

 
 Nikamma at Bollywood hungama

2020s Hindi-language films
Sony Pictures Networks India films
Indian romantic comedy films
Hindi remakes of Telugu films
Indian action comedy films
Films directed by Sabbir Khan
Film productions suspended due to the COVID-19 pandemic
Films postponed due to the COVID-19 pandemic
2022 action comedy films
2020s masala films
Indian family films
Films about memory